The Kielder Forest Star Camp is an annual star party held each autumn and spring in Kielder Forest. The five night event is based on the Kielder Campsite. Free talks on astronomy are held at nearby Kielder Castle on the Saturday. The event started in October 2003.

See also
 List of astronomical societies

References

External links
 Kielder Forest Star Camp Web Site

British astronomy organisations
Star parties
Tourist attractions in Northumberland
North East England
Science and technology in Northumberland
Science events in the United Kingdom